Seoul has been known in the past by successive names, including Wiryeseong and Hanseong (Baekje era), Bukhansangun (Goguryo era), Hanyang (North and South states period), Namgyeong (Goryeo era), Hanyangbu (Goryeo under Mongol rule), Hanseong (Joseon era) and Hanyang. In the Joseon era, it started to be called Seoul by the public. In the middle of Joseon era,  Hanseong & Hanyang were almost replaced by Seoul and only remained formal name. During the period of Japanese colonial rule, Seoul was referred to by the Japanese exonym , or Gyeongseong in Korean. After World War II and Korea's liberation, the city took its familiar name, Seoul.

Etymology of "Seoul"
Seoul is a rendering of the Korean word “seo'ul”, pronounced [səˈul]. An etymological hypothesis presumes that the origin of the native word “seo'ul” derives from the native name Seorabeol, which originally referred to Gyeongju, the capital of Silla, then called Geumseong.

Hanseong
 
On a 1751 map of China and Korea prepared in France, Seoul was marked as "King-Ki-Tao, Capitale de la Corée", using an approximation of the Chinese pronunciation of Gyeonggi Province. The use of "King-Ki-Tao"  to refer to Seoul was repeated again on the 1851 Tallis/Rapkin map of both Japan and Korea. For a time during the late 1940s and early 1950s, the transliterated name , which closely resembles the English pronunciation for Seoul, was used.

This often caused problems in translation, as in Korean, the terms "Seoul" and "Hanseong" are considered different. There exist many institutions and entities, most of them having no connections whatsoever, which use either name.

The name was chosen by a select committee out of two names, the other being .

The chosen name is a close transliteration of Seoul in Mandarin Chinese;  can also mean "first" or "capital". For a some time after the name change, Chinese-language news media have used both names interchangeably during their publications or broadcasts ( in print,  [literally: Shouer, formerly Hancheng] in television and radio).
This change was intended for Chinese speakers only, and has no effect on the Korean language name. The new name would be written and pronounced 수이 (Su-i) in Korean. Some linguists have criticized the selection of the new name, claiming that its pronunciation in Korean bears no resemblance to the native name at all, and that its intended representation of the Korean pronunciation, while effective in Mandarin, is lost in other regional dialects, such as in Cantonese, where the name is pronounced "sau2 yi5", or in Shanghainese, in which the new name is pronounced "sew2 el3". These critics have said that the names "" or "" (the latter being the ancient name of Seoul) would have been much more effective in representing the city's Korean name.

Gyeongseong

"Gyeongseong" is a Sino-Korean word for "capital city" (Gyeong means "capital" and seong means "walled city"). It was in occasional use to refer to Seoul throughout the Joseon dynasty, having earlier referred to the capitals of Goryeo and Silla.

Seoul was called Hanseong or Hanyang during the Joseon dynasty, but the city's main railway station, Seoul Station, opened with the name "Gyeongseong Station" in 1900, which it retained until 1905. It was called Gyeongseong Station again from 1923 to 1947, when it assumed its current name.

Gyeong is still used to refer to Seoul in the names of various railway lines and freeways, including:

Gyeongbu Line (Gyeongbuseon in Korean) and Gyeongbu Expressway (Gyeongbu Gosok Doro) between Seoul and Busan;
Gyeongin Line (Gyeonginseon) and Gyeongin Expressway (Gyeongin Gosok Doro) between Seoul and Incheon;
Gyeongui Line (Gyeonguiseon) between Seoul and Dorasan (the ui comes from Sinuiju,  the Revised Romanized spelling of Sinŭiju in North Korea, the line's original terminus on the Chinese border—see the article on the Gyeongui Line for details);
Gyeongwon Line (Gyeongwonseon) between Seoul and Baengmagoji (originally the line went to Wonsan in what is now North Korea); and
Gyeongchun Line (Gyeongchunseon) between Seoul and Chuncheon in Gangwon Province.

See also

 History of Seoul

References

External links
Korean Studies List discussion of the names Gyeongseong and Gyeongin

History of Seoul
Seoul, Names of
Seoul, Names of